The Shmyhal government is the current government of Ukraine, formed on 4 March 2020 and led by Denys Shmyhal, who was previously acting vice prime minister, and earlier the Governor of Ivano-Frankivsk Oblast.

History
President Volodymyr Zelenskyy's first government was the Honcharuk Government, formed after the 2019 Ukrainian parliamentary election. However, Zelenskyy was dissatisfied with the government due to high ministerial salaries and poor performance. On 3 March 2020, Prime Minister Oleksiy Honcharuk tendered his resignation, and by law this triggered the automatic resignation of the Honcharuk Government. In his 4 March 2020 address to the parliament, Zelenskyy expressed his hope for a stronger government, and that day Honcharuk was dismissed by the Verkhovna Rada (Ukraine's parliament) and Denys Shmyhal was appointed prime minister.

The transition from the Honcharuk government was treated in some local press as worrisome, with the Kyiv Post calling it "hasty" and "awkward".

Appointment of Shmyhal as Prime Minister 
The appointment of Shmyhal as the Prime Minister of Ukraine was approved by the Verkhovna Rada in a special session on 4 March 2020. Shmyhal was an acting vice prime minister at the time of his appointment; he had previously served as Governor of Ivano-Frankivsk Oblast. 291 people's deputies voted for his candidacy, while the members of most of the other factions (Opposition Platform — For Life, European Solidarity, Fatherland, and Voice) did not support it.

Composition
At the time of appointment of the government five minister seats remained vacant at the following ministries: the Ministry of Economy, the Ministry of Agriculture, the Ministry of Energy, the Ministry of Culture, and the Ministry of Education. Four ministers kept the same post as they had in the previous Honcharuk government: the Digital Transformation Minister Mykhailo Fedorov, Justice Minister Denys Maliuska, Infrastructure Minister Vladyslav Krykliy, and Interior Minister Arsen Avakov. Two ministers switched posts: Vadym Prystaiko left the Foreign Ministry and became the Deputy Prime Minister for Eurointegration while Dmytro Kuleba did the complete opposite, taking on the post of the Minister of Foreign Affairs. On 18 May 2021 parliament dismissed Krykliy as Minister.

All the ministerial posts — apart from those of the Ministers of Defense and Minister of Foreign Affairs that were put forward for voting by President Zelensky as these post are presidential nominations — were voted in by a package vote, with the support of 277 people's deputies.

Health Minister Illia Yemets and Finance Minister Ihor Umansky were dismissed by the parliament on 30 March 2020.

Initially the government did not have a separate Environmental Minister (the Ministry of Energy and Environmental Protection was at first responsible for environmental policies), but on 19 June 2020 Roman Abramovsky was appointed Minister of Environmental Protection and Natural Resources.

On 4 July 2020 President Zelensky announced that a (new post of) Deputy Prime Minister for Industrial Policy could appear in the government in a week. On 16 July 2020 Oleh Urusky was appointed Vice Prime Minister responsible for the new Ministry of Strategic Industries of Ukraine.

In the (previous government installed in August 2019) Honcharuk government the ministry responsible for agricultural policies was the Ministry of Economic Development, Trade and Agriculture. But in January 2020 President Zelensky stated the need to split the agriculture part of this Ministry. When the Shmyhal government was formed the Minister (in the Honcharuk government) of Economic Development, Trade and Agriculture, Tymofiy Mylovanov refused to head a newly reestablish Ministry of Agriculture. On 9 July 2020 Zelensky predicted that "at maximum in September" Ukraine would have a separate Minister of Agriculture again. On 17 December 2020 Roman Leshchenko was appointed as Minister of Agricultural Policy and Food. Mykola Solskyi replaced him on 24 March 2022.

Veteran Minister Serhiy Bessarab resigned on 16 December 2020 for health reasons. He was replaced two days later with Yulia Laputina.

On 18 May 2021 the Ukrainian parliament dismissed Ihor Petrashko as Minister of Economic Development and Trade. Two days later his successor became Oleksiy Liubchenko, who was also appointed First Deputy Prime Minister. Liubchenko was dismissed by Parliament on 3 November 2021.

On 12 July 2021 Minister of Internal Affairs Arsen Avakov announced that he had submitted his resignation as Interior Minister, and his resignation was accepted by parliament two days later. On 16 July 2021 Denys Monastyrsky was appointed Avakov's successor. Following his January 2023 death in a helicopter crash, Monastyrsky was succeeded by Ihor Klymenko on 7 February 2023.

Environmental minister Roman Abramovsky and minister of Strategic Industries of Ukraine Oleh Urusky and Minister of Defence Andriy Taran were dismissed by Parliament on 3 November 2021.

On 2 December 2022 the Ministry of Communities and Territories Development and the Ministry of Infrastructure were merged, creating the Ministry of Development of Communities, Territories and Infrastructure. Infrastructure minister Oleksandr Kubrakov took over as head of the combined ministry.

Three Ministers were dismissed by parliament on 20 March 2023; Minister of Education and Science Serhiy Shkarlet, Minister of Strategic Industries Pavlo Riabikin and the Minister of Digital Transformation Mykhailo Fedorov. The same day parliament received Prime Minister Shmyhal's submissions on the appointment of three ministers; Mykhailo Fedorov as Deputy Prime Minister for Innovation, Development of Education, Science and Technology, Minister of Digital Transformation,  as Minister of Education and Science and Oleksandr Kamyshin as Minister of Strategic Industries.

See also
 9th Ukrainian Verkhovna Rada

Notes

References

Ukrainian governments
9th Ukrainian Verkhovna Rada
Cabinets established in 2020
2020 establishments in Ukraine
Current governments